The Kanmiu Buque Qieyun (刊謬補缺切韻) by Wang Renxu (王仁昫), which was published in 706, is the oldest extant Chinese rime dictionary. For many centuries believed lost, a copy was found at the imperial palace in Beijing in 1947. Lóng 1968 published an eye copy with annotations. Zhou 1983: 434-527 includes a facsimile of the original, which is not very legible.  

There are three versions of Kānmiù Bǔquē Qièyùn, which are typically distinguished by numerals as and they are distinguished by numbers 王一, 王二, and 王三. 

The first version, 王一, is known only from a Dunhuang fragment (P. 2011). The second, 王二 is also called Xiàngbáběn 项跋本, because there is a postscript by Xiàng Yuánbiàn 项元汴, or as Péiwùqí Zhèngzìběn 裴务齐正字本. The third version, 王三, is also called Quánwáng 全王 (because it is complete), Gùgōngběn 故宫本 (because it was found in the Palace Museum), or Sòngbáběn 宋跋本 (because there is a postscript by Sòng Lián 宋濂). Generally speaking, the first and third versions are most alike, whereas the second is more distinct, and is often considered to combine the Kānmiù Bǔquē Qièyùn 刊谬补缺切韵 by Wáng Rénxù 王仁昫 per se and the Jiānzhùběn Qièyùn 笺注本切韵 by Zhǎngsūn Nèyán 长孙讷言, maybe S. 2055 (Zhōu Zǔmó 周祖谟, 1983; Tóng Xiǎolín 仝小琳, 2008).

Works cited

External links 
A comprehensive parallel presentation of various Qieyun fragments and editions, by Suzuki Shingo 鈴木 慎吾, including the Kanmiu Buque Qieyun  

Traditional Chinese phonology
Chinese dictionaries
Rhyme
8th-century Chinese books